Institute of Management and Information Technology, Cuttack, IMIT Cuttack is a state government management institution and the first institute of information technology and management established by the government of Odisha in 1962. It is in the city of Cuttack, in the eastern part of the state of Odisha, India.

IMIT Cuttack is also known as 'College of Accountancy and Management Studies (CAMS)' which is an institution imparting postgraduate degrees in Master of Business Administration, Master of Computer Application and MTech in Information Technology which is affiliated to Biju Patnaik University of Technology under AICTE. The college offers Post Graduate and Research programmes in computer science and Business Administration. Being twin to the state capital, Bhubaneswar, the Cyber heart of Odisha, it enjoys many advantages.Its close proximity to many large scale industries, central and state public sector undertaking and technical institutions has provided opportunities to its students for project work, practical training and research. While strengthening human resource development efforts in the country, this college lays greater emphasis on qualitative sense of education and not merely quantitative one.

References

All India Council for Technical Education
Engineering colleges in Odisha
Business schools in Odisha
Universities and colleges in Odisha
Colleges affiliated with Biju Patnaik University of Technology
Education in Cuttack
Educational institutions established in 1962
1962 establishments in Orissa